The women's 2013 Rugby World Cup Sevens tournament was held at Luzhniki stadium and nearby Gorodok Stadium, both in Moscow. The tournament was held from 29 June to 30 June, with New Zealand beating Canada 29−12 at the final. The eight quarter-finalists qualified as core teams for the 2013–14 IRB Women's Sevens World Series.

Teams

Notes:
 Canada qualified for the tournament through NACRA's regional qualifying tournament taking the 1 and only place available in the North America/Caribbean category.
 Tunisia qualified for the tournament taking the 1 available place in the Africa category.
 England, Ireland, Spain, France and Netherlands qualified for the tournament taking the 5 available places in the European category.
 Fiji, Japan, and China qualified for the tournament through AFRU's regional qualifying tournament taking the 3 available places in the Asian and Oceania category.
 Brazil qualified through CONSUR's regional qualifying tournament taking the 1 and only place in the South America category.

Squads

Draw
The band allocation was completed on February 25 in advance of the pool draw on February 28.

The 16 teams were ranked in four bands of four, determined by series points accumulated over the three IRB Women's Sevens Challenge Cups, and the first two rounds of the 2012–13 IRB Women's Sevens World Series.

Pool Stage

All times are local (UTC+4).

Pool A
{| class="wikitable" style="text-align: center;"
|-
!width="200"|Teams
!width="40"|Pld
!width="40"|W
!width="40"|D
!width="40"|L
!width="40"|PF
!width="40"|PA
!width="40"|+/−
!width="40"|Pts
|-style="background:#ccffcc;"
|align=left| 
|3||3||0||0||97||5||+92||9
|-style="background:#ccffcc;"
|align=left| 
|3||2||0||1||65||27||+38||7
|-style="background:#fcc;"
|align=left| 
|3||1||0||2||33||61||−28||5
|-style="background:#fcc;"
|align=left| 
|3||0||0||3||3||105||−102||3
|}

Pool B
{| class="wikitable" style="text-align: center;"
|-
!width="200"|Teams
!width="40"|Pld
!width="40"|W
!width="40"|D
!width="40"|L
!width="40"|PF
!width="40"|PA
!width="40"|+/−
!width="40"|Pts
|-style="background:#ccffcc;"
|align=left| 
|3||3||0||0||87||5||+82||9
|-style="background:#ccffcc;"
|align=left| 
|3||2||0||1||45||37||+8||7
|-style="background:#fcc;"
|align=left| 
|3||1||0||2||24||48||−24||5
|-style="background:#fcc;"
|align=left| 
|3||0||0||3||17||83||−66||3
|}

Pool C
{| class="wikitable" style="text-align: center;"
|-
!width="200"|Teams
!width="40"|Pld
!width="40"|W
!width="40"|D
!width="40"|L
!width="40"|PF
!width="40"|PA
!width="40"|+/−
!width="40"|Pts
|-style="background:#ccffcc;"
|align=left| 
|3||3||0||0||62||19||+43||9
|-style="background:#ccffcc;"
|align=left| 
|3||1||1||1||47||43||+4||6
|-style="background:#fcc;"
|align=left| 
|3||1||0||2||34||52||−18||5
|-style="background:#fcc;"
|align=left| 
|3||0||1||2||33||62||−29||4
|}

Pool D
{| class="wikitable" style="text-align: center;"
|-
!width="200"|Teams
!width="40"|Pld
!width="40"|W
!width="40"|D
!width="40"|L
!width="40"|PF
!width="40"|PA
!width="40"|+/−
!width="40"|Pts
|-style="background:#ccffcc;"
|align=left| 
|3||2||1||0||57||51||+6||8
|-style="background:#ccffcc;"
|align=left| 
|3||2||0||1||69||17||+52||7
|-style="background:#fcc;"
|align=left| 
|3||1||1||1||69||41||+28||6
|-style="background:#fcc;"
|align=left| 
|3||0||0||3||10||96||−86||3
|}

Knockout stage

Bowl

Plate

Cup

References

 
2013
Women
2013 in women's rugby union
International women's rugby union competitions hosted by Russia